Winsor Township may refer to the following places:

 Winsor Township, Huron County, Michigan
 Winsor Township, Clearwater County, Minnesota
 Winsor Township, Brookings County, South Dakota

See also 
 Windsor Township (disambiguation)
 Winsor (disambiguation)

Township name disambiguation pages